Blue Hawk may refer to:
Blue Hawk Mine, Blue Grouse Mountain, British Columbia, Canada
Blue Hawk (roller coaster), at  Six Flags Over Georgia, Georgia, U.S.
Blue Hawk (video game)
Blue Hawk, brand of Artex Ltd.

See also
Blue hawker, a species of hawker dragonfly